Frank O'Keeffe (1923 - 25 March 2014) was an Irish Gaelic footballer who played as a left corner-forward for the Kerry senior team.

Born in Tralee, County Kerry, O'Keeffe first played competitive hurling during his tenure at St. Brendan's College, Killarney. He arrived on the inter-county scene when he first linked up with the Kerry minor team, before later lining out with the junior side. He made his senior debut in the 1946. O'Keeffe subsequently won one All-Ireland medal and two Munster medals. He was an All-Ireland runner-up on one occasion.

O'Keeffe represented the Munster inter-provincial team on just one occasion, winning one Railway Cup medal. At club level he won two championship medals with John Mitchels.

Throughout his inter-county career, O'Keeffe made 7 championship appearances for Kerry. His retirement came following the conclusion of the 1951 championship.

His son, John O'Keeffe, also played with Kerry, winning seven All-Ireland medals in a lengthy career.

Honours

Team

John Mitchels
Kerry Senior Football Championship (2): 1947, 1952

Kerry
All-Ireland Senior Football Championship (1): 1946
Munster Senior Football Championship (2): 1947, 1951
Munster Junior Football Championship (1): 1946
Munster Minor Football Championship (1): 1941

Munster
Railway Cup (1): 1948

References

1923 births
2014 deaths
John Mitchels (Kerry) Gaelic footballers
Kerry inter-county Gaelic footballers
Munster inter-provincial Gaelic footballers
Winners of one All-Ireland medal (Gaelic football)